Galvanic (after Luigi Galvani) may refer to:

 Galvanic anode
 Galvanic bath
 Galvanic cell
 Galvanic corrosion
 Galvanic current
 Galvanic isolation
 Galvanic series
 Galvanic skin response
 Galvanic vestibular stimulation
 Galvanism
 Galvanization
 Operation Galvanic, World War II attack which included the Battle of Tarawa

See also 
 List of forms of electricity named after scientists